The Lotos-Eaters is a poem by Alfred Tennyson, 1st Baron Tennyson, published in Tennyson's 1832 poetry collection. It was inspired by his trip to Spain with his close friend Arthur Hallam, where they visited the Pyrenees mountains. The poem describes a group of mariners who, upon eating the lotos, are put into an altered state and isolated from the outside world. The title and concept derives from the lotus-eaters in Greek mythology.

Background
In summer 1829, Tennyson and Arthur Hallam made a trek into conflict-torn northern Spain. The scenery and experience influenced a few of his poems, including Oenone, The Lotos-Eaters and Mariana in the South.These three poems, and some others, were later revised for Tennyson's 1842 collection. In this revision Tennyson takes the opportunity to rewrite a section of The Lotos-Eaters by inserting a new stanza before the final stanza. The new stanza describes how someone may have the feelings of wholeness even when there is great loss. It is alleged by some that the stanza refers to the sense of loss felt by Tennyson upon the death of Hallam in 1833.

Poem

The mariners are put into an altered state when they eat the lotos. During this time, they are isolated from the world:

The mariners explain that they want to leave reality and their worldly cares:

The mariners demonstrate that they realise what actions they are committing and the potential results that will follow, but they believe that their destruction will bring about peace:

Although the mariners are isolated from the world, they are connected in that they act in unison. This relationship continues until the very end when the narrator describes their brotherhood as they abandon the world:

Themes
The form of the poem contains a dramatic monologue, which connects it to "Ulysses", St. Simeon Stylites, and Rizpah. However, Tennyson changes the monologue format to allow for ironies to be revealed. The story of The Lotos-Eaters comes from Homer's The Odyssey. However, the story of the mariners in Homer's work has a different effect from Tennyson's since the latter's mariners are able to recognize morality. Their arguments are also connected to the words spoken by Despair in Edmund Spenser's The Faerie Queene, Book One. With the connection to Spenser, Tennyson's story depicts the mariners as going against Christianity. However, the reader is the one who is in the true dilemma, as literary critic James R. Kincaid argues, "The final irony is that both the courageous Ulysses and the mariners who eat the lotos have an easier time of it than the reader; they, at least, can make choices and dissolve the tension."

Tennyson ironically invokes The Lover's Tale line 118, "A portion of the pleasant yesterday", in line 92 of The Lotos-Eaters: "Portions and parcels of the dreadful past". In the reversal, the idea of time as a protector of an individual is reversed to depict time as the destroyer of the individual. There is also a twist of the traditionally comic use of repetition within the refrain "Let us alone", which is instead used in a desperate and negative manner. The use of irony within The Lotos-Eaters is different from Tennyson's The Lady of Shalott since "the Lady" lacks control over her life. The mariners within The Lotos-Eaters are able to make an argument, and they argue that death is a completion of life. With this argument, they push for a release of tension that serves only to create more tension. Thus, the mariners are appealing yet unappealing at the same time.

In structure, The Lotos-Eaters is somewhere between the form of Oenone and "The Hesperides". In terms of story, The Lotos-Eaters is not obscure like "The Hesperides" nor as all-encompassing as Oenone but it still relies on a frame like the other two. The frame is like "The Hesperides" as it connects two different types of reality, one of separation and one of being connected to the world. Like Oenone, the frame outlines the song within the poem, and it allows the existence of two different perspectives that can be mixed at various points within the poem. The perspective of the mariners is connected to the perspective of the reader in a similar way found in "The Hesperides", and the reader is called to follow that point of view to enjoy the poem. As such, the reader is a participant within the work but they are not guided by Tennyson to a specific answer. As James Kincaid argues, "in this poem the reader takes over the role of voyager the mariners renounce, using sympathy for a sail and judgment for a rudder. And if, as many have argued, the poem is 'about' the conflict between isolation and communality, this meaning emerges in the process of reading."

The poem discusses the tension between isolation and being a member of a community, which also involves the reader of the poem. In the song, there are many images that are supposed to appeal to the reader. This allows for a sympathy with the mariners. When the mariners ask why everything else besides them are allowed peace, it is uncertain as to whether they are asking about humanity in general or only about their own state of being. The reader is disconnected at that moment from the mariner, especially when the reader is not able to escape into the world of bliss that comes from eating lotos. As such, the questioning is transformed into an expression of self-pity. The reader is able to return to being sympathetic with the mariners when they seek to be united with the world. They describe a system of completion, life unto death, similar to Keats's "To Autumn", but then they reject the system altogether. Instead, they merely want death without having to experience growth and completion before death.

Critical response
Tennyson's 1832 collection of poems was received negatively by the Quarterly Review. In particular, the April 1833 review by John Croker stated that The Lotos-Eaters was "a kind of classical opium-eaters" and "Our readers will, we think, agree that this is admirable characteristic; and that the singers of this song must have made pretty free with the intoxicating fruit. How they got home you must read in Homer: — Mr Tennyson — himself, we presume, a dreamy lotos-eater, a delicious lotus-eater — leaves them in full song."

In popular culture 

The British romantic composer Edward Elgar set to music the first stanza of the "Choric Song" portion of the poem for a cappella choir in 1907-8. The work, "There is Sweet Music" (op. 53, no. 1), is a quasi double choir work, in which the female choir responds the male choir in a different tonality.
Another British romantic composer Hubert Parry wrote a half-hour-long choral setting of Tennyson's poem for soprano, choir, and orchestra. In the song "Blown Away" by Youth Brigade, lines from the poem are used, such as "Death is the end of life; ah, why/Should life all labour be?/Let us alone. Time driveth onward fast" and "let us alone; what pleasure can we have to war with evil? is their any peace"

The poem inspired, in part, the R.E.M. song "Lotus". "There’s the great English poem about the lotus eaters, who sit by the river and — I guess it’s supposed to be about opium — never are involved in life. Maybe there’s a bit of that in there," said Peter Buck.

In episode 5 of HBO's series The White Lotus, Armond recites Choric Song IV of Tennyson's poem. The episode is named "The Lotus-Eaters".

See also
 Lotos Club

Notes

References
 Hughes, Linda. The Manyfacèd Glass. Athens, Ohio: Ohio University Press, 1988.
 Kincaid, James. Tennyson's Major Poems. New Haven: Yale University Press, 1975.
 Thorn, Michael. Tennyson''. New York: St. Martin's Press, 1992.
 

1832 poems
Narrative poems
Poetry by Alfred, Lord Tennyson
Poetry based on the Odyssey